This is a list of high schools, also known as secondary colleges, in the state of Victoria, Australia. The list includes Government, Private, Independent and Catholic schools.

A
 Academy of Mary Immaculate
 Aitken College
 Alamanda College
 Albert Park College
 Alexandra Secondary College
 Alia College
 Alice Miller School
 Alkira Secondary College
 Alphington Grammar School
 Altona Secondary College
 Antonine College
 Apollo Bay College
 Aquinas College
 Ararat Community College
 Ashwood High School
 Assumption College, Kilmore
 Auburn High School
 Australian International Academy
 Ave Maria College, Melbourne
 Avila College

B
 Bacchus Marsh College
 Bacchus Marsh Grammar School
 Baimbridge College
 Bairnsdale Christian Community School
 Bairnsdale Secondary College
 Ballarat Christian College
 Ballarat Clarendon College
 Ballarat Grammar School
 Ballarat High School
 Ballarat Secondary College
 Balwyn High School
 Bannockburn P-11 Collage
 Bayside Christian College
 Bayside College
 Bayswater Secondary College
 Bayview College
 Beaconhills College
 Beaufort Secondary College
 Beechworth Secondary College
 Belgrave Heights Christian School
 Bellarine Secondary College
 Belmont High School, Geelong
 Benalla College
 Bendigo Senior Secondary College
 Bendigo South East College
 Bentleigh Secondary College
 Berengarra School, The
 Berwick Grammar School
 Berwick Secondary College
 Beth Rivkah Ladies College
 Bialik College
 Billanook College
 Birchip School
 Blackburn High School
 Bogong Outdoor Education Centre
 Boort Secondary College
 Boronia Heights College
 Box Hill High School
 Box Hill Senior Secondary College
 Braemar College
 Brauer College Warrnambool
 Braybrook College
 Brentwood Secondary College
 Bright College
 Brighton Grammar School
 Brighton Secondary College
 Broadford Secondary College
 Brookside College
 Brunswick Secondary College
 Buckley Park College
 Bundoora Secondary College

C
 Camberwell Girls Grammar School
 Camberwell Grammar School
 Camberwell High School
 Camperdown College
 Cann River College
 Canterbury Girls' Secondary College
 Carey Baptist Grammar School
 Caroline Chisholm Catholic College
 Carranballac College
 Carrum Downs Secondary College
 Carwatha College, Melbourne
 Casey Grammar School
 Casterton Secondary College
 Castlemaine Secondary College
 Cathedral College Wangaratta
 Catherine McAuley College
 Catholic College (Sale)
 Catholic College Wodonga
 Catholic Ladies' College
 Catholic Regional College (Caroline Springs)
 Catholic Regional College (Melton)
 Catholic Regional College (North Keilor)
 Catholic Regional College (St Albans)
 Catholic Regional College (Sydenham)
 Caulfield Grammar School
 Chaffey Secondary College
 Chairo Christian School
 Charles La Trobe College
 Charlton College
 Cheltenham Secondary College
 Christian Brothers College
 Christian College, Geelong
 Clonard College
 Cobden Technical School
 Cobram Anglican Grammar School
 Cobram Secondary College
 Coburg High School
 Cohuna Secondary College
 Colac College
 Collingwood College
 Copperfield College
 Cornish College
 Corryong College
 Covenant College, Geelong
 Craigieburn Secondary College
 Cranbourne East Secondary College
 Cranbourne Secondary College
 Creek Street Christian College
 Creekside College
 Crusoe Secondary College

D
 Damascus College
 Dandenong High School
 Darul Ulum College
 Daylesford Secondary College
 De La Salle College (Australia)
 Derrinallum College
 Diamond Valley College
 Dimboola Memorial Secondary College
 Distance Education Centre, Victoria
 Donald High School
 Doncaster Secondary College
 Donvale Christian College
 Doveton College
 Dromana College
 Drouin Secondary College

E
 Eaglehawk Secondary College
 East Doncaster Secondary College
 East Loddon College
 East Preston Islamic College
 Echuca College
 Edenhope College
 Edgars Creek Secondary College
 Elisabeth Murdoch College
 Eltham College of Education
 Eltham High School
 Elwood College
 Emerald Secondary College
 Emmanuel College: Notre Dame Campus
 Emmanuel College: St. Paul's Campus
 Emmanuel College, Warrnambool
 Emmaus College
 Epping Secondary College
 Essendon Keilor College
 Euroa Secondary College

F
 Fairhills High School
 FCJ College Benalla
 Featherbrook College
 Fintona Girls' School
 Firbank Girls' Grammar School
 Fitzroy High School
 Flinders Christian Community College
 Footscray City College
 Forest Hill College
 Foster Secondary College
 Fountain Gate Secondary College
 Frankston High School

G
 Galen Catholic College
 Geelong Baptist College
 Geelong Grammar School
 Geelong High School
 Geelong Lutheran College
 Genazzano FCJ College
 Gilmore College for Girls
 Gilson College
 Gippsland Grammar School
 Girton Grammar School
 Gisborne Secondary College
 Gladstone Park Secondary College
 Glen Eira College
 Glen Waverley Secondary College
 Good Shepherd College
 Goroke College
 Goulburn Valley Grammar School
 Greensborough College
 Grovedale College
 Gleneagles Secondary College

H
 Haileybury College, Melbourne
 Hamilton and Alexandra College
 Hampton Park Secondary College
 Hawkesdale College
 Healesville High School
 Heathdale Christian College
 Heatherton Christian College
 Heathmont College
 Henderson College
 Heritage College
 Heywood and District Secondary College
 Highvale Secondary College
 Highview College
 Hillcrest Christian College
 Hopetoun College
 Hoppers Crossing Secondary College
 Horsham College
 Hume Central Secondary College
 Huntingtower School

I
 Ilim College of Australia
 Irymple Secondary College
 Ivanhoe Girls' Grammar School
 Ivanhoe Grammar School

J
 John Paul College
 John Monash Science School

K
 Kambrya College
 Kaniva College
 Kardinia International College
 Karingal Park Secondary College
 Keilor Downs College
 Kensington Community High School
 Kerang Technical High School
 Kew High School
 Keysborough Secondary College
 Kilbreda College
 Killester College
 Kilmore International School
 Kilvington Grammar School
 King's College, Warrnambool
 Kingswood College
 Kolbe Catholic College, Greenvale
 Koo Wee Rup Secondary College
 Koonung Secondary College
 Korowa Anglican Girls' School
 Korumburra Secondary College
 Kurnai College
 Kurunjang Secondary College
 Kyabram Secondary College
 Kyneton Secondary College

L
 Lake Bolac College
 Lakes Entrance Secondary College
 Lakeside Lutheran College
 Lalor North Secondary College
 Lalor Secondary College
 Lara Secondary College
 Lauriston Girls' School
 Lavalla Catholic College
 Lavers Hill College
 Laverton College
 Leibler Yavneh College
 Leongatha Secondary College
 Lighthouse Christian College
 Lilydale Adventist Academy
 Lilydale Heights College
 Lilydale High School
 Little Yarra Steiner School
 Loreto College, Ballarat
 Loreto Mandeville Hall
 Lorne P-12 College
 Lowanna Secondary College
 Lowther Hall Anglican Grammar School
 Loyola College, Melbourne
 Luther College (Victoria)
 Lynall Hall Community School
 Lyndale Secondary College
 Lyndhurst Secondary College

M
 Mackillop Catholic Regional College
 Mackillop College
 Macleod College
 Mac.Robertson Girls' High School
 Maffra Secondary College
 Mallacoota College
 Manangatang College
 Mansfield Secondary College
 Maranatha Christian School
 Marcellin College
 Marian College (Ararat)
 Marian College (Myrtleford)
 Marian College (Sunshine West)
 Maribyrnong Secondary College
 Marist-Sion College
 Maroondah Secondary College
 Mary MacKillop Catholic Regional College
 Maryborough Education Centre
 Marymede Catholic College
 Mater Christi College
 Matthew Flinders Girls' Secondary College
 Mazenod College
 McGuire College
 McKinnon Secondary College
 Melbourne Girls' College
 Melbourne Girls' Grammar School
 Melbourne Grammar School
 Melbourne High School
 Melbourne Rudolf Steiner School
 Melton Christian College
 Melton Secondary College
 Mentone Girls' Grammar School
 Mentone Girls' Secondary College
 Mentone Grammar School
 Mercy Diocesan College
 Mercy Regional College
 Methodist Ladies' College
 Mildura Baptist College
 Mildura Senior College
 Mill Park Secondary College
 Minaret College
 Mirboo North Secondary College
 Monash Secondary College
 Monbulk College
 Monivae College
 Monterey Secondary College
 Montmorency Secondary College
 Mooroolbark College
 Mooroopna Secondary College
 Mordialloc Secondary College
 Mornington Secondary College
 Mortlake College
 Mount Alexander College
 Mount Beauty Secondary College
 Mount Carmel Christian College
 Mount Clear College
 Mount Eliza Secondary College
 Mount Erin College
 Mount Evelyn Christian School
 Mount Hira College
 Mount Lilydale Mercy College
 Mount Ridley College
 Mount Rowan Secondary College
 Mount Scopus Memorial College
 Mount St Joseph Girls' College
 Mount Waverley Secondary College
 Mountain District Christian School
 Mowbray at Brookside
 Mowbray College
 Mullauna College
 Murrayville Community College
 Murtoa College
 Myrtleford Secondary College

N
 Nagle College
 Narre Warren South College
 Nathalia Secondary College
 Nazareth College, Melbourne
 Neerim District Secondary College
 Newcomb Secondary College
 Newhaven College
 Nhill College
 Niddrie Secondary College
 Noble Park Secondary College
 North Geelong Secondary College
 Northcote High School
 Northside Christian College
 Northern Bay College
 Norwood Secondary College
 Nossal High School
 Notre Dame College, Shepparton
 Numurkah Secondary College
 Nunawading Christian College

O
 Oakleigh Grammar School
 Oberon High School
 Olivet Christian College
 Orbost Secondary College
 Our Lady of Mercy College
 Our Lady of Sacred Heart College
 Our Lady of Sion College
 Ouyen College
 Overnewton Anglican Community College
 Oxley College
 Ozford College

P

 Padua College, Melbourne
 Pakenham Secondary College
 Parade College
 Parkdale Secondary College
 Pascoe Vale Girls' Secondary College
 Patterson River Secondary College
 Pembroke Secondary College
 Penleigh and Essendon Grammar School
 Penola Catholic College
 Peter Lalor Secondary College
 Phoenix Community College
 Plenty Valley Christian College
 Portland Secondary College
 Presbyterian Ladies' College, Melbourne
 Presentation College, Windsor
 Preshil, The Margaret Lyttle Memorial School
 Princes Hill Secondary College
 Pyramid Hill College

R
 Rainbow College
 Red Cliffs Secondary College
 Reservoir District Secondary College
 Ringwood Secondary College
 River City Christian College
 Robinvale College
 Rochester Secondary College
 Rosebud Secondary College
 Rowville Secondary College
 Roxburgh College
 Rushworth College
 Rutherglen High School
 Ruyton Girls' School

S
 Sacré Cœur School
 Sacred Heart College Geelong
 Sacred Heart College, Kyneton
 Sacred Heart College (Yarrawonga)
 Sacred Heart Girls' College
 Saint Ignatius College Geelong   formerly Catholic Regional College (Drysdale)
 Sale College
 Salesian College Chadstone
 Salesian College (Rupertswood)
 Samaritan Catholic College
 Sandringham College
 Santa Maria College
 Scoresby Secondary College
 Scotch College, Melbourne
 Seymour College
 Shelford Girls Grammar School
 Shepparton High School
 Sherbrooke Community School
 Siena College
 Simonds Catholic College, West Melbourne
 Sirius College
 South Coast Christian College
 South Gippsland Secondary College
 South Oakleigh Secondary College
 Southern Cross Grammar
 Southwood Boys' Grammar School
 Springvale Secondary College
 St Albans Secondary College
 St Aloysius' College
 St Andrew's Christian College
 St Anthony's Coptic Orthodox College
 St Arnaud Secondary College
 St Augustine's College Kyabram
 St Bede's College (Mentone)
 St. Bernard's College, Melbourne
 St Brigid's College, Horsham
 St Catherine's School, Toorak
 St. Columba's College, Melbourne
 St Francis Xavier College, Melbourne
 St Helena Secondary College
 St James College
 St John's Greek Orthodox College
 St John's Regional College
 St. Joseph's College, Echuca
 St Joseph's College Mildura
 St. Joseph's College, Geelong
 St. Joseph's College, Melbourne Closed in 2010
 St. Joseph's College, Ferntree Gully
 St. Kevin's College, Toorak
 St Leonard's College
 St Margaret's School
 St Mary of the Angels School
 St Mary's Coptic Orthodox College
 St Mary's College (Seymour)
 St Michael's Grammar School
 St Monica's College
 St Patrick's College, Ballarat
 St Paul's Anglican Grammar School
 St Peter's College, Cranbourne
 St Thomas Aquinas College
 Star of the Sea College
 Staughton College
 Stawell Secondary College
 Stott's College
 Strathcona Baptist Girls' Grammar School
 Strathmore Secondary College
 Sunbury College
 Sunbury Downs Secondary College
 Sunshine College
 Suzanne Cory High School
 Swan Hill College
 Swifts Creek School
 Swinburne Senior Secondary College
 Sydney Road Community School

T
 Tallangatta Secondary College
 Taylors College, Melbourne
 Taylors Lakes Secondary College
 Templestowe College
 Terang College
 The Geelong College
 The Grange College
 The Islamic Schools Of Victoria
 The King David School
 The Knox School
 The Meridian International School
 The Peninsula School
 Thomas Carr College
 Thomastown Secondary College
 Thornbury High School
 Timboon School
 Tintern Grammar
 Toorak College
 Trafalgar High School
 Traralgon College
 Trinity Anglican College
 Trinity College, Colac
 Trinity Grammar School, Victoria
 Trinity Lutheran College
 Tyrrell College

U
 University High School, Melbourne
 Upper Yarra Secondary College
 Upwey High School

V
 Vermont Secondary College
 Victoria University Secondary College
 Victorian College for the Deaf
 Victorian College of the Arts Secondary School
 Victory Christian College, Bendigo
 Victory Lutheran College, Wodonga
 Viewbank College

W
 Wallan Secondary College
 Wanganui Park Secondary College
 Wangaratta High School
 Wantirna College
 Warracknabeal Secondary College
 Warragul Regional College
 Warrandyte High School
 Warrnambool College
 Waverley Christian College
 Wedderburn College
 Weeroona College
 Wellington Secondary College
 Werribee Secondary College
 Werrimull College
 Wesley College, Melbourne (Elsternwick, Glen Waverley & St. Kilda Road Campuses)
 Westall Secondary College
 Westbourne Grammar School
 Western Heights College
 Western Port Secondary College
 Wheelers Hill Secondary College
 Whitefriars College
 Whittlesea Secondary College
 Williamstown High School
 Wodonga Middle Years College formed from merger between Mitchell Secondary College, Wodonga High School and Wodonga West Secondary College
 Wodonga Senior Secondary College formed from merger between Mitchell Secondary College, Wodonga High School and Wodonga West Secondary College
 Wonthaggi Secondary College
 Woodleigh School
 Woodmans Hill Secondary College
 Worawa Aboriginal College
 Wycheproof College
 Wyndham Central College

X
 Xavier College

Y
 Yarra Valley Grammar School
 Yarram Secondary College
 Yarrawonga Secondary College
 Yea High School
 [[Yeshivah College 
 Yarra hills secondary college
Australia|Yeshivah College]]

See also
 List of schools in Australia
 List of schools in Victoria
 List of high schools in Melbourne

High schools
High
High schools